Yves Rocheleau (born 31 October 1944) was a member of the House of Commons of Canada from 1993 to 2004. He is a consultant by career, including government work.

Born in Cap-de-la-Madeleine, Quebec, Rocheleau was elected in the Trois-Rivières electoral district under the Bloc Québécois party in the 1993, 1997 and 2000 elections, serving in the 35th, 36th and 37th Canadian Parliaments respectively.

In the 1984 general election, he unsuccessfully campaigned in the Trois-Rivières riding for the Parti nationaliste du Québec.

Rocheleau left Canadian federal politics in 2004.

External links
 

1944 births
Living people
Bloc Québécois MPs
Members of the House of Commons of Canada from Quebec
People from Trois-Rivières
Parti nationaliste du Québec politicians
21st-century Canadian politicians